The 2022 Trophée des Champions was the 27th edition of the French Super Cup. The match was contested by the 2021–22 Ligue 1 champions, Paris Saint-Germain, and the 2021–22 Coupe de France winners, Nantes. It took place at Bloomfield Stadium in Tel Aviv, Israel on 31 July 2022. The decision to play the match in Israel received criticism from the BDS movement in France.

Paris Saint-Germain won the match 4–0 for their record eleventh Trophée des Champions title.

Match

Details

Notes

References

External links
  (in French)

Trophée des Champions
FC Nantes matches
Paris Saint-Germain F.C. matches
2022–23 in French football
2021–22 in Israeli football
International club association football competitions hosted by Israel
Sports competitions in Tel Aviv